Éverson Teixeira (born 23 November 1974) is a Brazilian sprinter. He competed in the men's 4 × 400 metres relay at the 1996 Summer Olympics.

References

1974 births
Living people
Athletes (track and field) at the 1996 Summer Olympics
Brazilian male sprinters
Brazilian male hurdlers
Olympic athletes of Brazil
Athletes from São Paulo
Pan American Games medalists in athletics (track and field)
Pan American Games silver medalists for Brazil
Athletes (track and field) at the 1995 Pan American Games
Medalists at the 1995 Pan American Games
20th-century Brazilian people
21st-century Brazilian people